Sayyid Arash Hosseini Milani is an Iranian reformist politician who currently serves as a member of the City Council of Tehran.

References

Living people
Tehran Councillors 2017–
Union of Islamic Iran People Party politicians
Year of birth missing (living people)